The 2019 Northern Colorado Bears football team represented the University of Northern Colorado in the 2019 NCAA Division I FCS football season. They were led by ninth-year head coach Earnest Collins Jr. and played their home games at Nottingham Field. They were a member of the Big Sky Conference. They finished the season 2–10, 2–6 in Big Sky play to finish in a five-way tie for ninth place. On November 24, 2019, Earnest Collins Jr. was let go after nine seasons, he finished at Northern Colorado with a record of 28–72.

Previous season
The Bears finished the 2018 season 2–9, 2–6 in Big Sky play to finish in 11th place.

Preseason

Big Sky preseason poll
The Big Sky released their preseason media and coaches' polls on July 15, 2019. The Bears were picked to finish in thirteenth place in both polls.

Preseason All-Big Sky team
The Bears did not have any players selected to the preseason all-Big Sky team.

Schedule

Source: Schedule

Despite also being a member of the Big Sky, the game at Sacramento State will be a non-conference game and will have no effect on the Big Sky standings.

Game summaries

at San Jose State

at Washington State

at Sacramento State

South Dakota

Idaho

at Northern Arizona

at Eastern Washington

Portland State

at Idaho State

Montana State

at North Dakota

Cal Poly

References

Northern Colorado
Northern Colorado Bears football seasons
Northern Colorado Bears football